In December 2004, with 2 months left on his contract, Sorin Cârţu and president Nicu Boghici agreed for a departure. January 2005 came with rumors which said that Mittal Steel would take over the team, for which they already were shirt sponsors. Soon after, Viorel Anghelinei, former player of Oțelul and referee, was appointed as the new president of the club. The new manager of Oțelul, Mihai Stoichiţă was announced on the 23rd of January.

Competitions

Friendlies

UEFA Cup

Liga 1

League table

Results by round

Results summary

Matches

Cupa României

Players

Squad statistics

Transfers

In

Out

References

External links
 The Rec.Sport.Soccer Statistics Foundation at rsssf.com
 Divizia A at romaniansoccer.ro

ASC Oțelul Galați seasons
Otelul Galati